Neama Said Fahmi Said (born 15 November 2002) is an Egyptian weightlifter. She won the gold medal in the women's 64kg event at the 2021 World Weightlifting Championships held in Tashkent, Uzbekistan. In 2018, she won the silver medal in the girls' 58kg event at the Summer Youth Olympics held in Buenos Aires, Argentina.

Career 

In 2019, at the Youth World Weightlifting Championship held in Las Vegas, United States, she won the gold medal in the women's 59kg event. At the 2019 African Weightlifting Championships in Cairo, Egypt, she won the silver medal in the women's 64kg event. She also set new African youth records at this competition for the Snatch, Clean & Jerk and Total events.

In that same year, she also represented Egypt at the 2019 African Games held in Rabat, Morocco and she won the bronze medal in the women's 64kg event. She also won the silver medal in the Clean & Jerk event and the bronze medal in the Snatch event.

She won the gold medal in her event at the 2022 Junior World Weightlifting Championships held in Heraklion, Greece. She won the gold medal in the women's 71kg Snatch and Clean & Jerk events at the 2022 Mediterranean Games held in Oran, Algeria.

Achievements

References

External links 

 

Living people
2002 births
Place of birth missing (living people)
Egyptian female weightlifters
Weightlifters at the 2018 Summer Youth Olympics
African Games bronze medalists for Egypt
African Games medalists in weightlifting
Competitors at the 2019 African Games
World Weightlifting Championships medalists
Competitors at the 2022 Mediterranean Games
Mediterranean Games gold medalists for Egypt
Mediterranean Games medalists in weightlifting
21st-century Egyptian women